Sawyer Brown is the self-titled debut studio album by American country music band Sawyer Brown. It features the singles "Leona" (#16 on Hot Country Songs), "Step That Step" (their first #1), and "Used to Blue" (#3).
"Staying Afloat" was first recorded two years earlier by The Oak Ridge Boys on their album, Step on Out.

Track listing

Personnel 
 Mark Miller – lead vocals
 Gregg "Hobie" Hubbard – keyboards, backing vocals
 Bobby Randall – acoustic guitar, electric guitars, backing vocals
 Jim Scholten – bass 
 Joe "Curley" Smyth – drums, percussion

Production 
 Randy Scruggs – producer, mixing
 Tom Brown – engineer, mixing 
 David LaBarre – editing 
 Glenn Meadows – mastering at Masterfonics (Nashville, Tennessee)
 Roy Kohara – art direction 
 John O'Brien – design 
 Greg Gorman – photography

Charts

Weekly charts

Year-end charts

References

External links
[ Sawyer Brown] at Allmusic

1985 debut albums
Capitol Records albums
Sawyer Brown albums